Pokkiri Mannan  is a 2015 Indian Tamil-language action film directed by Ragomadhesh and starring choreographer Sridhar in his lead debut opposite Kannada actress Spoorthi Suresh with Singampuli in an important role. Producer Ramesh Reddy plays the antagonist.

Plot

Cast 
Sridhar as Marudhu
Spoorthi as Archana
Singampuli as Kali
Mayilsamy as Marudhu's father
Ramesh Reddy as Teja
Vishwanth as Marudhu's friend

Release
The film released on 4 September alongside Paayum Puli and Savaale Samaali after the Tamil Film Producers Council move its strike.

Reception 
A critic from The Times of India rated the film 1/5 and said "the film is as infuriating as nails on a chalkboard".  Malini Mannath of The New Indian Express criticised the film and opined that "There is a sense of deja vu throughout, the plot seeming like a weak copy of earlier such formula flicks". A critic from Dinakaran criticised the film's plot holes. A critic from Dinamalar criticised the film's lack of story. A critic from Maalaimalar praised the cast's performance.

References

External links 
 

2015 films
2015 action films
Indian action films
2010s Tamil-language films